Tom McCulloch (born 10 February 1964) is an Australian former soccer player and coach. McCulloch played at both professional and international levels as a defender.

Career

Playing career
McCulloch played club football for Marconi Stallions, APIA Leichhardt and Sydney City. His is Marconi's all-time NSL appearance holder.

He also made 14 official international appearances for Australia, scoring one goal, between 1985 and 1992. He had previously competed at the 1983 FIFA World Youth Championship.

Coaching career
After retiring as a player, McCulloch coached Hajduk Wanderers and Marconi Stallions.

Teaching career
As of 2010, Tom McCulloch has been teaching at Chifley College Shalvey Campus as a PDHPE/Sport teacher.

References

1964 births
Living people
Australian soccer players
Australia international soccer players
Australia B international soccer players
Association football defenders